Schaeberle is an impact crater on the far side of the Moon. It lies to the northeast of the much larger walled plain Milne. Due north of Schaeberle is the relatively fresh crater Izsak, and an equal distance to the east-northeast lies Zhiritskiy.

This crater has a worn and eroded outer rim. There is a small crater attached to the outer rim along the northwest, and an irregular section at the southern end. What marks this crater as relatively unusual for a far side formation, however, is the interior floor. It has the relatively lower albedo that is characteristic of resurfacing by flows of basaltic lava, although it is not nearly as dark as the floor of Tsiolkovskiy. The floor is marked only by a few tiny craterlets.

Satellite craters
By convention these features are identified on lunar maps by placing the letter on the side of the crater midpoint that is closest to Schaeberle.

References

 
 
 
 
 
 
 
 
 
 
 
 

Impact craters on the Moon